The National Assembly (Portuguese: Assembleia Nacional) is the unicameral legislative body of the Democratic Republic of São Tomé and Príncipe.

The Assembly is elected for a four-year term. The Assembly can be dissolved by the President of the Republic in case of a serious institutional crisis, only with the approval of the Council of State, a consultative assembly composed of 12 members.

The National Assembly was founded in 1975, as a result of the adoption of the Constitution of São Tomé and Príncipe. From 1975 to 1990, the Assembly served as a rubber-stamp to the one-party regime led by the Movement for the Liberation of São Tomé and Príncipe. With the constitutional reforms of 1990, the country became a multi-party democracy and the first competitive elections were organised in 1991.

Latest election results

Previous election results

* The Independent Democratic Action (ADI) party was a member of the Uê Kédadji coalition in the 2002 election.

List of presidents

See also
History of São Tomé and Príncipe
List of national legislatures
Legislative Branch

References

External links
  

Politics of São Tomé and Príncipe
Political organisations based in São Tomé and Príncipe
Sao Tome and Príncipe
Sao Tome and Príncipe